The EHF Champions Trophy (named IHF Supercup between 1979 and 1983, named EHF Supercup between 1996 and 2007) was an official annual club competition of the European Handball Federation, that was contested until 2008.

History
Regarded as one of the strongest handball competitions in Europe it was usually played among club winners of the top three EHF competitions (EHF Champions League, EHF Cup, EHF Cup Winner's Cup) during the previous season and the fourth club, either a host or a special EHF invitee.

Winners

Statistics

By country

References

European Handball Federation competitions
Recurring sporting events established in 1979
Recurring sporting events disestablished in 2008